Dasarathan is a 1993 Indian Tamil language-language action film, directed by actor Kitty making his directorial debut credited under his real name Raja Krishnamoorthy. The film stars Sarathkumar and Heera, while Sivakumar, Saranya and Ganthimathi play supporting roles. It was released on 5 February 1993.

Plot 
Dasarathan wants to become a high ranking policeman and is also a hard working man who fights against bad people. But his father does not like Dasarathan fighting with people and always quarrels with him to not interfere in other people's problems. Dasarathan, while travelling in a bus, saves Heera from bad people. Heera gets a file of Dasarathan in the bus and later goes to his house to return the file. Heera finds out that she was the school time girlfriend of Dasarathan and knows his father, who used to give food to anybody who came to his house. Heera tries to learn cooking and help Dasarathan's father, but spoils the whole kitchen. Dasarathan and Heera falls in love and marry.

Meanwhile, Dasarathan gets appointed as a commissioner and tries to deal with a riot. During the riot, Dasarathan shoots at an innocent man who accidentally came in the front of the riot. The news comes in the newspapers. Dasarathan's father, after reading the news, goes to the area where the victim lived with his wife. Dasarathan's father helps the victim's wife, Sharanya and her child. Dasarathan, now staying in another house, finds his father is missing from the house. Dasarathan encounters a new politician enemy who was behind the previous riot, which made Dasarathan kill the innocent man. Dasarathan's father and Sharanya become witnesses for a policeman's death due to rowdies of the politician.

Dasarathan, investigating the policeman's death, finds out evidence to the killing of an old man and Sharanya, but doesn't know his father is the witness. Dasarathan enters Sharanya's house and accidentally finds out his father is living with Sharanya, and he while leaving the area, he gets attacked by rowdies of the politician. Now Dasarathan's father helps in the hospital and takes care of Dasarathan. Later all of them stay in one place. Now at night, the politician and his rowdies try to kill Dasarathan's family. During the attack, the house's electricity goes off. Dasarathan also finally enters to the house, and a fight in the darkness happens, with Sarath finally defeating the politician villain and his rowdies.

Cast 
 Sarathkumar as Dasarathan
 Heera
 Sivakumar as Dasarathan's father
 Saranya
 Ganthimathi
 Charle

Soundtrack 
Soundtrack was composed by L. Vaidyanathan.

Reception 
Kalki wrote that the director seemed to have been confused whether to make his kind of a film or a Sarathkumar kind of film.

References

External links 
 

1990s Tamil-language films
1993 action films
1993 directorial debut films
1993 films
Fictional portrayals of the Tamil Nadu Police
Films scored by L. Vaidyanathan
Indian action films